Fight of the Living Dead is a reality streaming television series where 10 YouTube stars were selected to take part in a simulated zombie apocalypse and try to survive for 72 hours straight. Fight of the Living Dead: Live-Action Video Game, which was produced before BlackBoxTV's partnership with YouTube Premium debuted on April 5, 2015, was a six episode pre-season, totaling under one hour combined. It starred Jesse Wellens, Meghan Camarena, Iman Crosson, Joey Graceffa, Justine Ezarik, Jeana Smith, Jarrett Sleeper,  Sam Pepper and Olga Kay.

Pre-Youtube Premium season one, titled Fight of the Living Dead, premiered on April 5, 2015.

The first season, titled Fight of the Living Dead: Experiment 88,  premiered on August 17, 2016.

The second season, titled Fight of the Living Dead: Paradise Calls, premiered on October 31, 2017.

Premise 
Very well known YouTubers are thrown into an experiment by an organization known as CONOP, who have developed a biological weapon that reanimates the dead and transforms them into zombies. The experiment places them in an area where zombies known to be present. They must fight for their lives by completing different missions together to survive a 72-hour period in said area. Each episode chronicles the events that transpire in the 72 hours. During their stay they meet up with several characters with unknown purposes and intent.

Missions 
In each episode, CONOP instructs one or more subjects via a Communications Room or through a radio whilst out of base to complete missions which could potentially lead to those nominated facing zombies and risking death. The subjects either decide as a group or are nominated by CONOP to venture out of the safe house. A mission is deemed complete if the primary objective is fulfilled.

Contestants

Live-Action Video Game

Experiment 88

Paradise Calls

Progress Charts

Live-Action Video Game

Experiment 88

Paradise Calls

 The test subject survived "Fight of the Living Dead".
 The test subject was on a mission and survived.
 The test subject was on a mission and died.
 The test subject was revived.
 The test subject was in the episode as a zombie.
 The test subject died in the previous episode and does not appear.
 The test subject hasn't joined the game.
 The test subject fate was set at the end of the episode.
 The test subject was imprisoned that episode

Notes 

 : Jesse and Jeana broke up in May 2016 and now run solo channels. Jeana runs the BFvsGF channel, now called Jen Smith, and Jesse runs the PRANKvsPRANK channel, now called Jesse.
 : Meghan was killed because of a Zombified Olga accidentally opening the car door in an earlier shot, locking the door and not giving Meghan the chance to enter the car.
 : JC was voted by the test subjects to be "revived" and rejoin the group after his elimination over Brittani and Vitaly.

Deaths

"Live-Action Video Game" Deaths (Not on YouTube Premium)
Live Action Video Game! (1): 
 
Olga Kay (Bit and infected by a Zombie while escaping the jail cells).
 
Meet with Team 1 (2): 
 
Sam Pepper (Infected by a Zombie in the Triage Unit).
 
ON TOP OF A COP CAR! (3): 
 
No Deaths.
 
Get to the Boiler Room (4): 
 
Jarrett Sleeper (Already infected; forced away by ConOp Cops).
 
Found Dr. Altagarcia (5): 
 
Jeana Smith (Killed by a Zombified Jarrett Sleeper in the hallway while getting to the Boiler Room).
 
Justine Ezarik (Killed by a Zombified Jarrett Sleeper in the Boiler Room).
 
FINALE (6): 
 
Joey Graceffa (Patched ripped off and spurted blood by Dr. Altagarcia).
 
Iman Crosson (Arms ripped off in the Boiler Room).
 
Meghan Camarena (Gets locked out and devoured by a Zombified Sam Pepper).
 
Jesse Wellens escapes.

Season 1 Deaths (on YouTube Premium) {Experiment 88}
It Begins! (1): 
 
Brittani Louise Taylor (Ganged up on and devoured in Corridor).
 
Help is Found (2): 
 
Dennis Roady (Bitten and arm ripped off in Corridor).
 
Safe No More (3): 
 
Shanna Malcolm (Cornered and Devoured in Ella's Office).
 
Yousef Erakat (Tackled and presumed dead in Corridor).
 
Showdown (4): 
 
Vitaly Zdorovetskiy (Guts ripped out in Armory).
 
JC Caylen (Eaten alive in Corridor).
 
Trust No One (5):
 
No Deaths.
 
Yousef Erakat is revived.
 
Tests (6): 
 
Yousef Erakat (Slips on a shield and gets devoured by a Zombified Dennis Roady and Dr. Bradley).
 
Survival (7): 
 
JC Caylen is brought back in the game.
 
Raya Moab (Eaten inside ConOp Industries by ConOp Zombie Nurse).
 
Brandon Bowen (Eaten outside ConOp Industries by Zombie Horde).
 
Trè Melvin (Eaten outside ConOp Industries by Zombie Clown).
 
Rahat Hossain and JC Caylen escape.

Season 2 Deaths (on YouTube Premium) {Paradise Calls}
Welcome To Paradise (1): 
 
No Deaths.
 
Trust No One (2): 
 
De’arra Taylor  (Tripped on a port-a-potty tube and got devoured by a Howler while running to the VIP Tent).
 
It Takes 2 To Tango (3): 
 
Anthony Trujillo (Neck ripped open by a Howler while finding the All Access Pass).
 
Help Wanted (4): 
 
No Deaths, but Anwar’s fate was set up in the end of the episode.
 
Tooz Got The Blues (5): 
 
Anwar Jibawi (Tackled on the ground and infected by Nocturnes).
 
Karina Garcia (Dragged away and devoured by Nocturnes off camera).
 
Get In-Formation (6): 
 
Ken Walker (Tackled and gets infected by Jimmie in the VIP Tent).
 
Helllo Jimmie (7): 
 
Wengie (Tripped over a pillow and was eaten by a Howler in the Business Center).
 
Eric Ochoa (Sacrificed himself for the All Access Pass and was eaten by Jimmie and some zombies).
 
Join Us (8): 
 
Juanpa Zurita (Got tackled and killed by a Zombified Ken).
 
Hannah Stocking (Escapes a horde, but gets tackled by a Howler before she could escape).
 
Jake Paul and Miles Jai escape.

Winners
 
Live-Action Video Game: Jesse Wellens
 
Season 1: Rahat Hossain and JC Caylen
 
Season 2: Jake Paul and Miles Jai

See also 
 
 I Survived a Zombie Apocalypse

References 

YouTube Premium original series
2015 web series debuts
Zombie web series
2017 web series endings